Tom Mix in Arabia is a 1922 American silent adventure film directed by Lynn Reynolds and starring Tom Mix, Barbara Bedford and George Hernandez.

Cast
 Tom Mix as Billy Evans 
 Barbara Bedford as Janice Terhune 
 George Hernandez as Arthur Edward Terhune 
 Norman Selby as Pussy Foot Bogs 
 Edward Peil Sr. as Ibrahim Bulamar 
 Ralph Yearsley as Waldemar Terhune 
 Hector V. Sarno as Ali Hasson

References

Bibliography
 Solomon, Aubrey. The Fox Film Corporation, 1915-1935: A History and Filmography. McFarland, 2011.

External links

1922 films
1922 adventure films
American adventure films
Films directed by Lynn Reynolds
American silent feature films
American black-and-white films
Fox Film films
1920s English-language films
1920s American films
Silent adventure films